Into1 (pronounced as Into One) is a multi-national Chinese boy group, formed through the 2021 reality show Produce Camp 2021 (Chuang 2021) on Tencent Video. The group consists of eleven members: Liu Yu, Santa, Rikimaru, Mika, Nine, Lin Mo, Bo Yuan, Zhang Jiayuan, Patrick, Zhou Keyu, Liu Zhang.

History

Pre-debut
Before Produce Camp 2021 began, all of the members of Into1 were previously active in the entertainment industry. Liu Yu debuted as an actor in the 2020 series "Dear Herbal Lord" and in 2018, participated in iQiyi’s national cultural talent contest, The Chinese Youth, placing 2nd. Bo Yuan is a member of the Chinese boy group 'ZERO-G' and was a contestant on Youth With You (season 1). Rikimaru and Santa are members of the Japanese-Chinese boy group 'WARPs Up'. Mika is a member of the Japanese boy group 'INTERSECTION' Patrick made his acting debut in the Thai GMMTV series The Gifted: Graduation. Nine made his acting debut in the Thai series 2 Moons 2: The Series as well as became a member of the Thai boy group 'OXQ'. Lin Mo is a member of the Chinese boy group 'YiAn Music Club'. Zhou Keyu is a member of 'BEST' as well as made his acting debut in 'Remember that Boy'. Zhang Jiayuan is a member of 'Galaxy Band'. Liu Zhang was a contestant on 'Rap for Youth'.

2021-present: Produce Camp 2021, and The Storm Center

Into1 was formed through the reality television show Chuang 2021 aired from February 17 to April 24, 2021. On the live broadcast of the finale, it was announced that Liu Yu placed first, followed by Santa, Rikimaru, Mika, Nine, Lin Mo, Bo Yuan, Zhang Jiayuan, Patrick, Zhou Keyu and Liu Zhang respectively.

The group officially debuted on the final episode of Produce Camp 2021 on April 24, 2021 and is expected to promote for around 2 years with the management rights handled by Wajijiwa Entertainment.

From May to June 2021, the group started active promotion and performed stages at various music festival. On July 15, 2021, the group released its first EP, The Storm Center, with the lead single "Into The Fire". The group also announced the group's two-year development plan, named "Into1's Wonderland".

Members 
Liu Yu (刘宇) - leader 
Santa (赞多)
Rikimaru (力丸)
Mika (米卡)
Nine (高卿尘)
Lin Mo (林墨)
Bo Yuan (伯远) - co-leader 
Zhang Jiayuan (张嘉元)
Patrick (尹浩宇)
Zhou Keyu (周柯宇)
Liu Zhang (刘彰)

Discography

Extended plays

Singles

Promotional Singles

Soundtrack Appearances

Concerts

Standalone Concerts
 Ready! Into1 Ocean（Into1《风暴眼》首唱会）(2021)

Concert Tours
 INTO1 "GROWN UP" Concert (2023)

Filmography

Reality shows

Awards

References

External links
 
 

Chinese boy bands
Mandopop musical groups
Chinese pop music groups
Chinese dance music groups
Mandarin-language singers
Produce 101
Produce 101 (Chinese TV series) contestants
Musical groups established in 2021
2021 establishments in China